The Tanya Moiseiwitsch Playhouse (formerly the Studio Theatre) is a studio theatre that forms part of the Sheffield Theatres complex in Sheffield, England. The theatre, which was opened in 1971, is situated in the same building as the Crucible Theatre and holds a maximum capacity of 400 people. The present artistic director is Rob Hastie.

In 2022, it was renamed in honour of Tanya Moiseiwitsch.

See also
Sheffield Theatres Productions

References

External links
Sheffield Theatres

Studio theatres in Sheffield